Hermínio da Palma Inácio (1922–2009) was a Portuguese revolutionary against the Salazar dictatorship.  Famously, he hijacked an airplane  in Morocco, forced it to fly over Lisbon dropping leaflets calling for free elections.  He then allowed the plane to return to Morocco, apologized to the passengers, presented all the ladies on board with a rose, and then vanished.

References

1922 births
2009 deaths
People from Lagoa, Algarve
Portuguese anti-fascists